{{DISPLAYTITLE:C24H38O3}}
The molecular formula C24H38O3 (molar mass: 374.557 g/mol) may refer to:

 Androstanolone valerate, or dihydrotestosterone pentanoate
 Canbisol

Molecular formulas